Phaio acquiguttata is a moth of the subfamily Arctiinae. It was described by Paul Dognin in 1909. It is found in Colombia.

References

Arctiinae
Moths described in 1909